Brunstetter is a surname. Notable people with the surname include:

Bekah Brunstetter (born 1982), American screenwriter and playwright
Peter S. Brunstetter (born 1956), American politician
Wanda E. Brunstetter, American novelist

See also
Branstetter